Seyyed Jalāl Āl-e-Ahmad (December 2, 1923September 9, 1969) was a prominent Iranian novelist, short-story writer, translator, philosopher, socio-political critic, sociologist, as well as an anthropologist who was "one of the earliest and most prominent of contemporary Iranian ethnographers". He popularized the term gharbzadegi – variously translated in English as "westernstruck", "westoxification", and "Occidentosis" –, producing a holistic ideological critique of the West "which combined strong themes of Frantz Fanon and Marx".

Personal life
Jalal was born in Tehran, into a religious family – his father was a cleric – "originally from the village of Aurazan in the Taliqan district bordering Mazandaran in northern Iran, and in due time Jalal was to travel there, exerting himself actively for the welfare of the villagers and devoting to them the first of his anthropological monographs". He was a cousin of Mahmoud Taleghani. After elementary school Al-e-Ahmad was sent to earn a living in the Tehran bazaar, but also attended Marvi Madreseh for a religious education, and without his father's permission, night classes at the Dar ul-Fonun. He went to Seminary of Najaf in 1944 but returned home very quickly. He became "acquainted with the speech and words of Ahmad Kasravi" and was unable to commit to the clerical career his father and brother had hoped he would take, describing it as "a snare in the shape of a cloak and an aba." He describes his family as a religious family in the autobiographical sketch that published after his death in 1967.

In 1946 he earned an M.A. in Persian literature from Tehran Teachers College and became a teacher, at the same time making a sharp break with his religious family that left him "completely on his own resources." He pursued academic studies further and enrolled in a doctoral program of Persian literature at Tehran University but quit before he had defended his dissertation in 1951. In 1950, he married Simin Daneshvar, a well-known Persian novelist. Jalal and Simin were infertile, a topic that was reflected in some of Jalal's works.

He died in Asalem, a rural region in the north of Iran, inside a cottage which was built almost entirely by himself. He was buried in Firouzabadi mosque in Ray, Iran. Commons and his wife, Simin, believe he was poisoned by SAVAK.

In 2010, the Tehran Cultural Heritage, Tourism and Handicrafts Department bought the house in which both Jalal Al-e Ahmad and his brother Shams were born and lived.

Political life

Gharbzadegi: "Westoxification" 

Al-e-Ahmad is perhaps most famous for using the term Gharbzadegi, originally coined by Ahmad Fardid and variously translated in English as weststruckness, westoxification and occidentosis - in a book by the same name Occidentosis: A Plague from the West, self-published by Al-e Ahmad in Iran in 1962. In the book Al-e-Ahmad developed a "stinging critique of western technology, and by implication of Western `civilization` itself". He argued that the decline of traditional Iranian industries such as carpet-weaving were the beginning of Western "economic and existential victories over the East." His criticism of Western technology and mechanization was influenced, through Ahmad Fardid, by Heidegger, and he also considered Jean-Paul Sartre as another seminal philosophical influence. There was also Ernst Jünger, to whom Jalal ascribe a major part in the genealogy of his famous book, and he goes on to say "Junger and I were both exploring more or less the same subject, but from two viewpoints. We were addressing the same question, but in two languages." Throughout the twelve chapters of the essay, Al-e Ahmad defines gharbzadegi as a contagious disease, lists its initial symptoms and details its etiology, diagnoses local patients, offers prognosis for patients in other localities, and consults with other specialists to suggest a rather hazy antidote.

His message was embraced by the Ayatollah Khomeini, who wrote in 1971 that "The poisonous culture of imperialism [is] penetrating to the depths of towns and villages throughout the Muslim world, displacing the culture of the Qur'an, recruiting our youth en masse to the service of foreigners and imperialists..."

and became part of the ideology of the 1979 Iranian Revolution, which emphasized nationalization of industry, independence in all areas of life from both the Soviet and the Western world, and "self-sufficiency" in economics. He was also one of the main influences of Ahmadinejad.

Discourse of authenticity

Ali Mirsepasi believes that Al-e Ahmad is concerned with the discourse of authenticity along with Shariati. According to Mirsepasi, Jalal extended his critiques of the hegemonic power of west. The critique is centered on the concept of westoxication. Al-e Ahmad attacks secular intellectual with the concept. He believes that the intellectuals could not construct effectively an authentically Iranian modernity. In this occasion, he posed the concept of “return” to an Islamic culture which is authentic at the same time. Al-e Ahmad believed for avoiding the homogenizing and alienating forces of modernity, it is necessary to return to roots of Islamic culture. In fact, Al Ahmad wanted to reimagine modernity with Iranian-Islamic tradition.

Political activism
Al-e-Ahmad joined the communist Tudeh Party along with his mentor Khalil Maleki shortly after World War II. They "were too independent for the party" and resigned in protest over the lack of democracy and the "nakedly pro-Soviet" support for Soviet demands for oil concession and occupation of Iranian Azerbaijan. They formed an alternative party the Socialist Society of the Iranian Masses in January 1948 but disbanded it a few days later when Radio Moscow attacked it, unwilling to publicly oppose "what they considered the world's most progressive nations." Nonetheless, the dissent of Al-e-Ahmad and Maleki marked "the end of the near hegemony of the party over intellectual life."

He later helped found the pro-Mossadegh Tudeh Party, one of the component parties of the National Front, and then in 1952 a new party called the Third Force. Following the 1953 Iranian coup d'état Al-e-Ahmad was imprisoned for several years and "so completely lost faith in party politics" that he signed a letter of repentance published in an Iranian newspaper declaring that he had "resigned from the Third Force, and completely abandoned politics." However, he remained a part of the Third Force political group, attending its meetings, and continuing to follow the political mentorship of Khalil Maleki until their deaths in 1969.In 1963, visited Israel for two weeks, and in his account of his trip stated that the fusion of the religious and the secular he discerned in Israel afforded a potential model for the state of Iran. Despite his relationship with the secular Third Force group, Al-e-Ahmad became more sympathetic to the need for religious leadership in the transformation of Iranian politics, especially after the rise of Ayatollah Khomeini in 1963.

Literary life

Al-e-Ahmad used a colloquial style in prose. In this sense, he is a follower of avant-garde Persian novelists like Mohammad-Ali Jamalzadeh. Since the subjects of his works (novels, essays, travelogues and ethnographic monographs) are usually cultural, social and political issues, symbolic representations and sarcastic expressions are regular patterns of his books. A distinct characteristic of his writings is his honest examination of subjects, regardless of possible reactions from political, social or religious powers.

On invitation of Richard Nelson Frye, Al-e-Ahmad spent a summer at Harvard University, as part of a Distinguished Visiting Fellowship program established by Henry Kissinger for supporting promising Iranian intellectuals.

Al-e-Ahmad rigorously supported Nima Yushij (father of modern Persian poetry) and had an important role in acceptance of Nima's revolutionary style.

In "a short but prolific career", his writings "came to fill over thirty-five volumes."

Novels and novellas
The School Principal
By the Pen
The Tale of Beehives
The Cursing of the Land
A Stone upon a Grave

Many of his novels, including the first two in the list above, have been translated into English.

Short stories
 "The setar"
 "Of our suffering"
 "Someone else's child"
 "Pink nail-polish"
 "The Chinese flower pot"
 "The postman"
 "The treasure"
 "The Pilgrimage"
 "Sin"

Critical essays
"Seven essays"
"Hurried investigations"
"Plagued by the West" (Gharbzadegi)

Monographs
Jalal traveled to far-off, usually poor, regions of Iran and tried to document their life, culture and problems. Some of these monographs are:
"Owrazan"
"Tat people of Block-e-Zahra"
"Kharg Island, the unique pearl of the Persian Gulf"

Travelogues
A Straw in Mecca
A Journey to Russia
A Journey to Europe
A Journey to the Land of Israel  ("The land of Azrael")
A Journey to America

Translations
The Gambler by Fyodor Dostoyevsky
L'Etranger by Albert Camus
Les mains sales by Jean-Paul Sartre
Return from the U.S.S.R. by André Gide
Rhinoceros by Eugène Ionesco

Jalal Al-e Ahmad Literary Award

The Jalal Al-e Ahmad Literary Award is an Iranian literary award presented yearly since 2008. Every year, an award is given to the best Iranian authors on the birthday of the renowned Persian writer Jalal Al-e Ahmad. The top winner receives 110 Bahar Azadi gold coins (about $33,000), making it Iran's most lucrative literary award. In some years there is no top winner, other notables receive up to 25 gold coins. Categories include "Novel", "Short story", "Literary criticism" and "History and documentations". The award was confirmed by the Supreme Cultural Revolution Council in 2005, the first award was presented in 2008.

See also
 Gholam-Hossein Sā'edi
 Ahmad Fardid
 Jalal Al-e Ahmad Literary Awards

References

External links

Al-i Ahmad, Jalal A biography by Iraj Bashiri, University of Minnesota.

1923 births
1969 deaths
Al-e Ahmad, Jalal
Al-e Ahmad, Jalal
Al-e Ahmad, Jalal
Al-e Ahmad, Jalal
Al-e Ahmad, Jalal
Al-e Ahmad, Jalal
Al-e Ahmad, Jalal
20th-century novelists
20th-century Iranian short story writers
Toilers Party of the Iranian Nation politicians
Tudeh Party of Iran members
Third Force (Iran) politicians
League of Iranian Socialists politicians
20th-century male writers
Iranian Writers Association members
20th-century anthropologists
20th-century Iranian philosophers
Muslim socialists
Iranian socialists